The Măgheruș is a right tributary of the river Bega Veche in Romania. It discharges into the Bega Veche in Covaci.

The Murani Dam is located on the Măgheruș.

References

Rivers of Romania
Rivers of Timiș County